The Queen's Nose is a children's novel by Dick King-Smith, first published by Gollancz in 1983 with illustrations by Jill Bennett. Set in England, where King-Smith lived, it features a girl who can use a fifty pence coin to make wishes. When the book was reprinted in 1994 publishers HarperTrophy commissioned a new cover art illustrated by Michael Koelsch. The book was adapted into the 1995 TV series The Queen's Nose, which ran for 7 series.

Plot

The book by Dick King-Smith features the story of Harmony Parker, a 10-year-old girl who wants an animal of her own, but this is not allowed by her parents, who think that animals are dirty. Harmony has a 15-year-old sister, Melody, who spends most of her time looking in a mirror. Harmony's best friend is a toy dog, Rex Ruff Monty.

Harmony believes that animals are more interesting than people, and so she pictures the people she meets as animals; her father is a sea lion, her mother a Pouter pigeon and her sister a Siamese cat.

She receives a magic 50p coin from her uncle Ginger, which grants her seven wishes whenever she rubs the side of the coin that Queen Elizabeth II's nose is pointed at.

Releases

Audio books

Books

References

External links

 —immediately, first US edition

1983 British novels
British children's novels
Children's fantasy novels
Victor Gollancz Ltd books
1983 children's books
Puffin Books books
Novels by Dick King-Smith